Katherine Montesino Hidalgo (born 17 January 1992) is a Cuban footballer who plays as a goalkeeper for the Cuba women's national team.

International career
Montesino capped for Cuba at senior level during the 2010 CONCACAF Women's World Cup Qualifying qualification and the 2018 CONCACAF Women's Championship (and its qualification).

References

1992 births
Living people
Cuban women's footballers
Cuba women's international footballers
Women's association football goalkeepers
21st-century Cuban women